Murat Cemcir (born November 30, 1976) is a Turkish actor of Georgian descent who appears regularly in Turkish films and on television, primarily in comedies.

Career 

Cemcir appeared in the film Çalgı Çengi with Ahmet Kural in 2011. He later starred with Kural in the sitcom İşler Güçler (Workforce), a behind-the-scenes comedy about television production.  In 2013, he starred in the film Düğün Dernek (Wedding Association), which became the most-watched Turkish film in 30 years. In 2014, he began performing in the new television comedy Kardeş Payı (Brothers Share). He and Ahmet Kural continues to play together in  franchise comedy films. He also is producer. He played in art movie Zeki Demirkubuz's "Yeraltı" and Nuri Bilge Ceylan's "Ahlat Ağacı" which premiered at Cannes Film Festival.

Filmography

References 

20th-century Turkish people
21st-century Turkish male actors
1976 births
Living people
Turkish male television actors
Mustafa Kemal University alumni
Turkish people of Georgian descent
Turkish male film actors